Bulgaria is a genus of fungi in the family Phacidiaceae. The genus was circumscribed in 1822 by Elias Magnus Fries, with Bulgaria inquinans assigned as the type species.

Species
Bulgaria cyathiformis 
Bulgaria geralensis 
Bulgaria inquinans 
Bulgaria moelleriana 
Bulgaria prunicola 
Bulgaria pusilla 
Bulgaria sydowii 
Bulgaria turbinata 
Bulgaria urnula

References

Leotiomycetes
Leotiomycetes genera
Taxa named by Elias Magnus Fries
Taxa described in 1822